Parkside School is a coeducational secondary school, including sixth form, located in Cullingworth in the City of Bradford, West Yorkshire, England.

The school was formed after a wide scale reorganisation of education in the Bradford district in 2000.  Today it is a foundation school administered by the Parkside Creative Learning Trust and Bradford City Council.  The school was also previously awarded specialist Arts College status.

References

External links
 

Secondary schools in the City of Bradford
Foundation schools in the City of Bradford